The canton of Pignan is an administrative division of the Hérault department, southern France. Its borders were modified at the French canton reorganisation which came into effect in March 2015. Its seat is in Pignan.

Composition

It consists of the following communes:
 
Cournonsec
Cournonterral
Fabrègues
Murviel-lès-Montpellier
Pignan
Saint-Georges-d'Orques
Saussan
Villeneuve-lès-Maguelone

Councillors

Pictures of the canton

External links
 Canton of Pignan Web site

References

Cantons of Hérault